The Men's 25 km Open Water swimming race took place on Saturday, 25 July, at Ostia beach in Rome. 23 men from 15 different countries competed. Valerio Cleri of Italy took home the gold with a time of 5:26:31.6.

Results

Key: OTL = Over Time Limit, DSQ = Disqualified, DNF = Did not finish, DNS = Did not start

See also
Open water swimming at the 2007 World Aquatics Championships – Men's 25 km

References

World Aquatics Championships
Open water swimming at the 2009 World Aquatics Championships